Chinese spinach can mean any of several plants grown as leaf vegetables in China (among other places):
Amaranthus dubius,, often bearing red or purple marks
Amaranthus tricolor
Capsella bursa-pastoris, "shepherd's purse",
Ipomoea aquatica (water spinach; 蕹菜; wèngcài) semi-aquatic with hollow stems and long, lance-shaped leaves. Known as kangkong in South-East Asia, sold as "Ong Choy" or "On Choy" in West Coast North American Chinese markets.
Malabar spinach, (落葵; luòkuí) with thick, succulent, heart-shaped leaves

See also
Spinach (disambiguation)